In cricket, the phrase "carrying the bat" refers to a situation in which an opening batter remains not out at the end of an innings where all the 10 wickets have fallen; the other 10 players in the team have all been dismissed. It may also be used in situations where one or more of these players are unable to bat due to retiring out or causes like injury or illness, and the remaining players are dismissed. It is not used, however, in any other situation where the innings closes before all 10 wickets have fallen, such as when it is declared closed, or when the team successfully chases a set run target to win the match. A rare feat, this has happened only 69 times in international cricket spanning all three formats—Tests, One Day Internationals (ODIs) and Twenty20 Internationals (T20Is).

In Tests, South African Bernard Tancred was the first cricketer to carry the bat; he made 26 runs in his team's total of 47 against England in 1889. The following year, Jack Barrett of Australia became the first player to carry the bat on debut. In the 1892 tour of Australia, England's Bobby Abel scored 132 and became the first player to score a century while carrying the bat. In 1933, Bill Woodfull of Australia set a new record by becoming the first player to perform this feat twice in Tests; he scored 73 not out during the third test of England's 1933 tour. Apart from Woodfull, five other cricketers have performed this feat more than once in their in Test careers—while Bill Lawry (Australia), Glenn Turner (New Zealand) and Len Hutton (England) have done it twice, Dean Elgar (South Africa) and Desmond Haynes (West Indies) have performed the feat on three occasions. , New Zealand's Tom Latham's 264, against Sri Lanka in December 2018, is the highest score in Test cricket by a player while carrying the bat. The Australian players have performed this feat more than any other, followed by England. In all, 48 players have carried their bats on 56 occasions in Test cricket.

In ODIs, there have been only 12 instances of a player carrying their bat. The first occasion was when Grant Flower made 84—in Zimbabwe's total of 205—against England in December 1994. The following year, Saeed Anwar became the first player to score an ODI century while carrying his bat; he made 103 against Zimbabwe in Harare. England's Nick Knight surpassed Anwar's score and went on to make 125 against Pakistan in 1996. , this remains a record in the ODI format. Australia's Damien Martyn and England's Alec Stewart are the only other players to score a century while performing this feat in ODIs. Sri Lanka's Upul Tharanga became the first cricketer from his team to carry the bat when he made 112 against Pakistan in October 2017.

In T20Is, Chris Gayle is the only player to carry his bat, doing so against Sri Lanka during the 2009 ICC World Twenty20, scoring 63 runs in West Indies' total of 101.

Flower became the first player to achieve this feat in two different international formats when he carried his bat in a Test match against Pakistan at Bulawayo in 1998. Since then, Anwar, Stewart, Javed Omar (Bangladesh), Gayle, Latham and Dimuth Karunaratne (Sri Lanka) have also managed this feat.

Key

Tests

ODIs

T20Is

Notes

References

Cricketers who have carried the bat in international cricket
International cricket records and statistics